Marcos Aurélio Fernandes da Silva (born 23 September 1977), known as Marcos Aurélio, is a Brazilian former professional footballer who played as a defensive midfielder or centre-back.

Biography
Marcos Aurélio was signed by Cruzeiro in 2005 for a reported R$50,000. He failed to play regularly for Cruzeiro due to injury. His contract was terminated in August 2005. In the same month he was signed by Fluminense in four-month deal. In 2006, he left for Chinese Super League and unsuccessfully converted to a forward.

In January 2007 he returned to Brazil and signed a one-year contract with Portuguesa. In January 2008 he renewed his contract to last until December 2010. In August he returned to São Caetano in one-year loan. He was released in April 2009 and transferred to Vitória for the rest of 2009 season. In January 2010 Brasiliense signed him definitely in -year contract. He was released again in August and joined Bragantino for the rest of 2010 season. In January 2011 he was offered a new one-year extension. In June he left for Itumbiara, again for the rest of 2011 season. He was released in September.

In 2012 at first he played for Audax-SP, then in February 2012 for Botafogo (SP) until end of the São Paulo state league.

In 2013, he left for São José Esporte Clube and scored twice.

Career statistics

References

External links

1977 births
Living people
Brazilian footballers
Brazilian expatriate footballers
Botafogo Futebol Clube (SP) players
Associação Atlética Portuguesa (Santos) players
Clube Náutico Capibaribe players
Esporte Clube XV de Novembro (Jaú) players
Joinville Esporte Clube players
Sociedade Esportiva Palmeiras players
Associação Desportiva São Caetano players
Cruzeiro Esporte Clube players
Fluminense FC players
Associação Portuguesa de Desportos players
Esporte Clube Vitória players
Brasiliense Futebol Clube players
Clube Atlético Bragantino players
Grêmio Osasco Audax Esporte Clube players
Marília Atlético Clube players
J1 League players
J2 League players
Avispa Fukuoka players
Kawasaki Frontale players
Tianjin Jinmen Tiger F.C. players
Chinese Super League players
Expatriate footballers in Japan
Expatriate footballers in China
Campeonato Brasileiro Série A players
People from Franca
Association football central defenders
Footballers from São Paulo (state)